Speeding. No one thinks big of you. is a multimedia advertising campaign launched by the Roads & Traffic Authority in June 2007 in New South Wales, Australia, to convince young drivers that speeding and irresponsible driving is not 'cool'.

The iconic image of the campaign is a wiggling pinkie finger, emblematic of the observer communicating to another observer their shared opinion that the speeding youth is not displaying virility by speeding, and is "overcompensating" for a small penis.

Several images were used in the television advertisement:
 several young women seeing the speeder;
 an older woman sharing a wiggling finger with a young woman;
 a male friend of the driver sharing a wiggling finger with another male friend as they ride in the back seat as their mutual friend drives stupidly.

References

External links
explanation of the advertisement 
 RTA fact page 
 TV ad online 
 YouTube version 

Advertising campaigns
Automotive advertising slogans
Public service announcements
Australian advertising slogans
2007 neologisms
Road safety